"Ceilings" (stylized in all lowercase) is a song by American singer-songwriter Lizzy McAlpine. It appeared on her second studio album, Five Seconds Flat, which was released on April 8, 2022. The folk-pop ballad, which has prominent strings in its instrumentation, describes the end of a night with McAlpine's partner that turns out to be a daydream about a relationship that already ended. 

"Ceilings" became McAlpine's breakthrough song after becoming popular on TikTok, where a trend of young women running through the rain and snow to the plot twist in the song's final verse soundtracked hundreds of thousands of videos. It became her first chart entry on the Billboard Hot 100, peaking at number 60, while peaking at number seven on the UK Singles Chart.

Background, music video, and TikTok success

"Ceilings" was included on Lizzy McAlpine's second studio album Five Seconds Flat, a folk-pop record released on April 8, 2022 on AWAL. A music video starring Michael Hanano, McAlpine's boyfriend at the time, was released on February 14, 2023. 

In early 2023, a sped-up version of the song's final verse became popular on TikTok, where it was used in over 200,000 videos, mostly of young women lip-syncing to the song while running through the rain or snow. Its online success led to the song being McAlpine's breakthrough song. She performed the song during her Tiny Desk Concert for NPR Music in November 2022 and on The Tonight Show Starring Jimmy Fallon in March 2023.

Composition and reception
"Ceilings" is a ballad with prominently featured strings. The lyrics of "Ceilings" detail the end of a night with McAlpine's partner that she doesn't want to end, and they end with a plot twist that the night was actually a daydream about a relationship that already ended, as McAlpine sings, "But it's not real/And you don't exist/And I can't recall the last time I was kissed" in the song's final verse. She based the song on a relationship she ended in college, as well as her going to London for three months to forget about it.

"Ceilings" was called "doleful" and "a plot-twisty ballad of heart-stomping hallucinations" by Bobby Olivier of Billboard, while Maggie Mancini of PhillyVoice similarly called it a "heartfelt" and "wistful, sometimes hallucinogenic ballad". Dorks Neive McCarthy praised "Ceilings" as "a particular standout" from the songs on Five Seconds Flat.

Chart performance
"Ceilings" debuted on the Billboard Hot 100 on the chart dated March 4, 2023, becoming McAlpine's first song to enter the chart. It also peaked at number number eight on the Hot Rock & Alternative Songs chart. In the United Kingdom, "Ceilings" peaked at number seven on the UK Singles Chart and was her first top-10 entry on the chart.

Charts

References

2022 songs
AWAL singles
Folk ballads
Pop ballads